

Victory over the Sun (Pobeda nad Solntsem) is a Russian Futurist opera premiered in 1913 at the Luna Park in Saint Petersburg.

The libretto written in zaum language was contributed by Aleksei Kruchonykh, the music was written by Mikhail Matyushin, the prologue was added by Velimir Khlebnikov, and the stage designer was Kazimir Malevich. The opera has become notable as the event where Malevich made his first Black Square, as part of a design for a curtain. The first performance was organised by the artistic group Soyuz Molodyozhi.

The plot concerns a group of protagonists who want to destroy reason, by disposing of time and capturing the sun.

The opera was intended to underline parallels between literary text, musical score, and the art of painting, and featured a cast of such extravagant characters as Nero and Caligula in the Same Person, Traveller through All the Ages, Telephone Talker, The New Ones, etc.

The audience reacted negatively and even violently to the performance, as have some subsequent critics and historians.

A documentary film about the opera was made in 1980.

Translation
Victory Over the Sun, ed. Patricia Railing, trans. Evgeny Steiner (London: Artists.Bookworks, 2009), 2 vols.

Further reading 
Victory Over the Sun: The World's First Futurist Opera (original Russian libretto, musical score, translation, critical and historical essays), eds. Rosamund Bartlett and Sarah Dadswell (University of Exeter Press, 2012). 

Anfang Gut, Alles Gut - Actualizations of the Futurist Opera Victory Over the Sun 1913, eds. Eva Birkenstock, Kerstin Stakemier, Nina Köller. Contributors: Roger Behrens, Devin Fore, Anke Hennig, Oliver Jelinski, Christiane Ketteler, Avigail Moss, Nikolai Punin, Marina Vishmidt. Kunsthaus Bregenz; Bilingual edition (31 March 2013). 

The original 1980 English translation of the opera by poet Larissa Shmailo was performed for the celebrated reconstruction of the First Futurist Opera at the Los Angeles County Museum of Art as well as the Brooklyn Academy of Music. It was performed in full staging with digital sets and synthesized music at Boston University 23 April 2015. 

In 2015, during the Art Basel fair, the Swiss Fondation Bayaler presented a production of the opera that was shown in the Theater Basel on 17 June 2015. It was a kind of preview to the In Search of 0,10 – The Last Futurist Exhibition of Painting exhibition that ran from 4 October 2015 to 10 January 2016 at the Fondation Bayaler.

References

External links
 Costume Design by Malevich
A modern reconstruction of the opera
 Zaum and Sun: The 'first Futurist opera' revisited Article by Isobel Hunter
 VICTORY OVER THE SUN The New York Times article
 Vienna 1993 staging including pictures of performance
 Rober Benedetti - Reconstructing Victory over the Sun at JSTOR (requires subscription)
 Victory over the Sun The Guardian article on the 1999 London recreation
 Valeri Shishanov. VITEBSK’ BUDETLANE

Operas
1913 operas
Russian avant-garde
Russian Futurism
Russian-language operas
Operas by Mikhail Matyushin